Bankura Zilla Saradamani Mahila Mahavidyapith, established in 1973, is a women's college in Bankura district of West Bengal, India. It is the only women's college in Bankura district. It offers undergraduate courses in arts and sciences. It is affiliated to Bankura University.

History
Bankura Zilla Saradamani Mahila Mahavidyapith was established to promote the higher education and culture among the young women of Bankura district and its adjoining areas. It was established as a non-government private college under the University of Burdwan. The college is named so to preserve the name of Sarada Devi.

Accreditation
Recently, Bankura Zilla Saradamani Mahila Mahavidyapith has been re-accredited and awarded A grade by the National Assessment and Accreditation Council (NAAC). The college is recognized by the University Grants Commission (UGC).

Departments

Science

Mathematics
Physics
Chemistry

Arts

Bengali
English
Sanskrit
History
Geography
Political Science
Philosophy
Economics
Music
Education

Library
The college has a well-equipped and partially computerized library. It has more than 15,750 books. The library subscribes to major magazines and newspapers.

See also

References

External links
Bankura Zilla Saradamani Mahila Mahavidyapith

Colleges affiliated to Bankura University
Educational institutions established in 1973
Women's universities and colleges in West Bengal
Universities and colleges in Bankura district
1973 establishments in West Bengal